Islamiyat Adebukola Yusuf (born 3 March 2003) is a Nigerian weightlifter, who competes in the 63/64 kg category and represents Nigeria at international competitions. In August 2022,  she won bronze at the 2022 Commonwealth Games.

References

External links 

Living people
2003 births
Nigerian female weightlifters
Weightlifters at the 2018 Summer Youth Olympics
Commonwealth Games bronze medallists for Nigeria
Weightlifters at the 2022 Commonwealth Games
Commonwealth Games medallists in weightlifting
21st-century Nigerian women
Medallists at the 2022 Commonwealth Games